Păiușu River may refer to:

 Păiușu River (Lotru), a tributary of the Mălaia River in Romania
 Păiușu, a tributary of the Jiu in Gorj County, Romania